Syhunt is a World Wide Web network security software company with headquarters in Rio de Janeiro, Brazil. Syhunt was founded in August 2003 by Felipe Daragon, a network security specialist.

History 
The company's operations are currently centered on the development of software relating to the assessment of web servers and web applications.

In 2003, Syhunt released a web application security assessment software known as Sandcat, which focuses on Open Web Application Security Project (OWASP) and the SANS Institute vulnerabilities. Syhunt has also produced a number of security software utilities, including worm removal tools (during worm outbreaks), server hardening and log analysis tools.

Today the company is still engaged in the development of web application security assessment software and also participates the Common Vulnerabilities and Exposures (CVE)  initiative.

See also
Penetration testing

References

External links

Computer security software companies
Software companies of Brazil
Companies based in Rio de Janeiro (city)
Information technology consulting firms
Software companies established in 2003
Consulting firms established in 2003
Brazilian brands
2003 establishments in Brazil